Las locuras de Tin-Tan ("The Follies of Tin-Tan") is a 1952 Mexican film. It was produced by 
Fernando de Fuentes.

Cast
 Germán Valdés - Tin-Tan 
 Carmelita González - Lolita
 Marcelo Chávez - Marcelo 
 Evangelina Elizondo - Paloma
 Tito Novaro - 
 Wolf Ruvinskis - 
 Eva Calvo - Marta
 Joaquín García Vargas - Napoleon
 Florencio Castelló - Don Manuel
 Armando Sáenz - Roberto
 Francisco Reiguera - Doctor Lucas de Mente
 Nicolás Rodríguez - Don Calixto
 Quinteto Allegro

External links
 

1952 films
1950s Spanish-language films
Mexican comedy films
1952 comedy films
Mexican black-and-white films
1950s Mexican films